Rolf Sperling (born 25 April 1940) is a German diver. He competed at the 1960 Summer Olympics, the 1964 Summer Olympics and the 1968 Summer Olympics.

References

External links
 

1940 births
Living people
German male divers
Olympic divers of the United Team of Germany
Olympic divers of East Germany
Divers at the 1960 Summer Olympics
Divers at the 1964 Summer Olympics
Divers at the 1968 Summer Olympics
Sportspeople from Halle (Saale)
20th-century German people